JGI can refer to:

 The JGI Group
 Jane Goodall Institute
 Joint Genome Institute